Johannes van Kampen (14 December 1899 – 3 July 1969) was a Dutch sprinter. He competed in the men's 100 metres and the 200 metres events at the 1924 Summer Olympics.

References

External links
 

1899 births
1969 deaths
Dutch male sprinters
Athletes (track and field) at the 1924 Summer Olympics
Olympic athletes of the Netherlands
Sportspeople from The Hague